James Neal Glerum (died December 5, 2020) was among the second generation of Central Intelligence Agency Paramilitary Case Officers. He played an integral role in paramilitary operations in China, Indonesia, Vietnam and Laos. Widely respected by subordinates and superiors alike, he rose to become the Chief of the Special Activities Division and was a key figure in the division's post-Vietnam era professional development and modernization. Glerum continued to act in a consulting capacity following his retirement and was also involved in a successful program to collect and organize an enormous body of files and records documenting the 60-plus year history of the Special Activities Division.

References

 Conboy, Kenneth J., and James Morrison. Feet to the Fire: CIA Covert Operations in Indonesia, 1957-1958. Naval Institute Press, 1999. , 9781557501936.

20th-century births
2020 deaths
People of the Central Intelligence Agency
Year of birth missing